Jean-Patrick Aladd Sahajasein (born 19 January 1970) is a Mauritian table tennis player. He competed in the men's singles event at the 2000 Summer Olympics.

References

External links
 

1970 births
Living people
Mauritian male table tennis players
Olympic table tennis players of Mauritius
Table tennis players at the 2000 Summer Olympics
Place of birth missing (living people)